Estádio Municipal de Abrantes (English: Abrantes Municipal Stadium) is a Portuguese multi-purpose stadium, adapted to Association football, rugby union and sport of athletics, inaugurated in 2005.
The sports complex where the stadium is located has a baseball park, the first in Portugal specially dedicated to the sport of baseball.

Sports venues in Santarém District
Buildings and structures in Santarém District
Sports venues completed in 2005